Provincial assembly may refer to:

Extant

Algeria
People's Provincial Assembly, the political body governing the provinces of Algeria

Congo
Provincial Assembly of Bas-Congo
Provincial Assembly of Kinshasa
Provincial Assembly of Maniema
Provincial Assembly of Sud-Kivu

Nepal
Provincial Assembly (Nepal) or Pradesh Sabha
Provincial Assembly of Province No. 1
Provincial Assembly of Province No. 2
Provincial Assembly of Bagmati Province
Provincial Assembly of Gandaki Province
Provincial Assembly of Lumbini Province
Provincial Assembly of Karnali Province
Provincial Assembly of Sudurpashchim Province

Pakistan
Provincial Assembly of Balochistan
Provincial Assembly of Khyber Pakhtunkhwa
Provincial Assembly of the Punjab
Provincial Assembly of Sindh

Defunct
 East Pakistan Provincial Assembly (1955-1971)
 Estonian Provincial Assembly (1917–1918)
 Pennsylvania Provincial Assembly (1681–1783)

See also
Member of the Provincial Assembly
Provincial council (disambiguation)